Phyllodictyon is a genus of green algae in the family Boodleaceae.

References

External links

Cladophorales genera
Boodleaceae